Fabiano José Costa Flora, also known as simply Fabiano Flora, is a Portuguese football manager. He is the current manager of Saudi Arabian club Al-Sahel.

Originally assistant coach, he superseded Stefan Hansson as Zayar Shwe Myay manager and lead them to a sixth-place finish, exceeding expectations. Zayar Shwe Myay asked him to not give up his manager role and to stay at the club.

In June 2016, his club were in second place of the 2016 Myanmar National League for a short period.

In the spring of 2022, he managed Latvian club Spartaks Jūrmala. On 18 July 2022, Flora was appointed as manager Saudi Arabian club Al-Sahel.

References

External links
 Ogol profile

Living people
1985 births
Portuguese expatriates in Myanmar
Portuguese football managers
Zayar Shwe Myay F.C.
Southern Myanmar F.C. managers
Saudi First Division League managers
Portuguese expatriate sportspeople in Italy
Expatriate football managers in Italy

Expatriate football managers in Myanmar
Portuguese expatriate sportspeople in Latvia
Expatriate football managers in Latvia
Portuguese expatriate sportspeople in Saudi Arabia
Expatriate football managers in Saudi Arabia